David Clough may refer to:

 David Marston Clough (1846–1924), American politician
 David L. Clough (born 1968), British author and academic